Dadu is a railway station on the Taiwan Railways Administration (TRA) West Coast line (Coastal line) located in Dadu District, Taichung, Taiwan.

History
The station was opened on 15 December 1920.

Structure
There is an island platform at the station.
There is no overpass and underpass at the station, and so passengers have to obey the staff's instructions concerning the crossing of the railway.

Service
As a minor station, Dadu Station is primarily serviced by Local Trains (區間車). A few times per day a Chu-Kuang Express (莒光號) or a Tzu-Chiang Limited Express (自強號) stops at the station.

Around the station
 Huangxi Academy

See also
 List of railway stations in Taiwan

References

1920 establishments in Taiwan
Railway stations in Taichung
Railway stations opened in 1920
Railway stations served by Taiwan Railways Administration